Shao Qihui (born June 1934) is a Chinese engineer and politician who served as governor of Heilongjiang from 1989 to 1994.

He was a representative of the 13th and 14th National Congress of the Chinese Communist Party. He was a member of the 14th Central Committee of the Chinese Communist Party. He was a delegate to the 7th and 8th National People's Congress. He was a member of the 9th National Committee of the Chinese People's Political Consultative Conference and a member of the Standing Committee of the 10th Chinese People's Political Consultative Conference.

Early life and education
Shao was born in the town of Gaocheng, Yixing, Jiangsu, in June 1934. He attended Hangzhou No. 2 High School and worked as secretary of the Youth League Committee at the school after graduation in September 1952. He joined the Chinese Communist Party (CCP) in October 1953.

Career in Zhejiang
In February 1955, he was appointed as deputy director of the Office of Hangzhou Municipal Committee of the Communist Youth League, and held that office until March 1958, when he was downgraded to worker at Wulin Machinery Factory due to "making ake mistakes".

Career in Heilongjiang
In February 1962, he was transferred to Harbin Forestry Machinery Factory, where he successively served as worker, technician, deputy factory director and chief engineer, and factory director. During that period, he studied at Harbin Institute of Technology by taking classes at night, majoring in machine manufacturing. After working in the factory for more than 23 years, he became deputy party secretary of the Harbin in May 1985, a position he held until April 1987, when he was made party secretary of Qiqihar. After a short term as vice governor of Heilongjiang between January 1988 and January 1989, he became acting governor in December 1988 and in January 1989 succeeded Hou Jie as governor.

Career in central government
In March 1998, he became director of the State Bureau of Machine Building Industry, a post he kept until September 1999.

References

1934 births
Living people
People from Yixing
Harbin Institute of Technology alumni
People's Republic of China politicians from Jiangsu
Chinese Communist Party politicians from Jiangsu
Members of the 14th Central Committee of the Chinese Communist Party
Delegates to the 7th National People's Congress
Delegates to the 8th National People's Congress
Members of the 9th Chinese People's Political Consultative Conference
Members of the Standing Committee of the 10th Chinese People's Political Consultative Conference